Dr. Esperanto's International Language, commonly referred to as  (First Book), is an 1887 book by Polish ophthalmologist L. L. Zamenhof, in which he first introduced and described the constructed language Esperanto.

Writing under the pseudonym "Dr. Esperanto", Zamenhof originally referred to the language as the international language; the use of Esperanto did not arise until 1889 when people began to use his pseudonym as the name of the language itself. Zamenhof reproduced a significant portion of the content of Unua Libro in the 1905 Fundamento de Esperanto, which he established as the sole obligatory authority over Esperanto in the Declaration of Boulogne, ratified by the first World Esperanto Congress later that year.

History

After many years of developing the language, Zamenhof completed Unua Libro by the spring of 1885 and spent the next two years looking for a publisher. In 1887, shortly after he married his wife Klara, his new father-in-law Aleksandr Silbernik advised him to use money from Klara's dowry to find a publisher. Following his advice, Zamenhof found a publisher in Warsaw, Chaim Kelter. On , Kelter published the book in Russian as International Language. Before the end of the year, Kelter published the Polish, French, and German editions of the book, as well.

In 1888, Zamenhof had Julian Steinhaus translate the book into English, and the translation was published under the title Dr. Esperanto's International Tongue. However, when Richard Geoghegan pointed out that Steinhaus's translation was very poor, Zamenhof destroyed his remaining copies and requested that Geoghegan produce a fresh translation. Henry Phillips, Jr., a secretary of the American Philosophical Society and early supporter of Esperanto, also produced a translation in 1889, titled An Attempt towards an International Language, but Geoghegan's translation remains the preferred standard.

Unua Libro was also translated into Hebrew, Yiddish, Swedish, and Lithuanian in 1889 and then into Danish, Bulgarian, Italian, Spanish, and Czech in 1890.

The name Unua Libro was applied retroactively to the book in relation to the title of Zamenhof's 1888 book Dua Libro (Second Book).

In 1905, Zamenhof reproduced much of the content of Unua Libro in Fundamento de Esperanto, which he established as the only obligatory authority over Esperanto in the Declaration of Boulogne at the first World Esperanto Congress later that year. However, in his 1888 Aldono al la Dua Libro (Supplement to the Second Book), he officially altered the spelling of the suffixes of the temporal correlatives (when, then, always, sometimes, never) from -ian to -iam, which rendered the Esperanto of Unua Libro slightly outdated.

Content
The book consists of three parts, an introduction, a grammar section, and a dictionary.

Zamenhof begins by renouncing all rights to the language, putting it in the public domain.

In the introduction, Zamenhof lays out his case for the need for an international auxiliary language (IAL). He states that previous attempts, such as Volapük, have failed because they have not overcome the three main difficulties an IAL must overcome in order to succeed. Those difficulties are:

In the next three parts, he addresses each difficulty specifically and explains why he believes Esperanto is fit to overcome them.

In part I, he explains the simplicity and flexibility of Esperanto grammar, particularly due to its regularity and use of affixes.

In part II, he demonstrates the ease of using Esperanto for international communication due to a simple and clear vocabulary. To demonstrate this, he translates the Our Father and Genesis 1:1–9 and presents a fictional letter and a few poems in Esperanto—"El Heine'", a translation, and "Mia penso" and "Ho, mia kor'", both original.

In part III, he presents an idea called the "universal vote", which is a campaign to allot 10 million signatures of people making the following pledge: "I, the undersigned, promise to learn the international language, proposed by Dr. Esperanto, if it shall be shown that ten million similar promises have been publicly given." He argues that this will prevent anyone from wasting time on learning the language since, once 10 million signatures have been gathered, there will be a significant population obliged to learn the language, rendering the language useful. He also welcomes critical feedback for the next year and promises to consider criticism before publishing a special booklet that will give definitive form to the language the following year (which was to be Aldono al la Dua Libro). Additionally, he lays out guidelines for a language academy to guide the evolution of the language in the future (which was to be the Akademio de Esperanto).

In the grammar section, he explains the Esperanto alphabet and sixteen grammar rules.

In the dictionary section, he presents a dictionary with 917 roots of vocabulary.

Reception and legacy
Zamenhof received a wide range of reactions to Unua Libro, from mocking criticism to avid interest. In the hundreds of letters he received, he saw enough support to prompt him to publish Dua Libro in January 1888 and La Esperantisto in 1889, in order to provide more Esperanto reading material for those with interest. In 1889, he also published Russian–Esperanto and German–Esperanto dictionaries to increase Esperanto vocabulary, as well as Aldono al la Dua Libro, a supplement to Dua Libro, to establish the definitive form of the language, a document he promised in part III of Unua Libro.

By all measures, Zamenhof's "universal vote" campaign failed. By 1889, he had only reached 1000 signatures, a mere 0.01% of his goal of 10 million. Nevertheless, the Esperanto movement continued onward. Among the early supporters were educated Russian and Polish Jews, Leo Tolstoy and his followers, Eastern European freemasons, and speakers of Volapük who had lost hope in their language.

See also
 History of Esperanto
 Esperanto Day

Footnotes

Notes

References

External links
 
 
 A collection of free Esperanto books compiled by David G. Simpson. This collection includes, among many others, reprints of the "canonical books" of the Esperanto language, i.e., Unua Libro, Dua Libro (with the Aldono al la Dua Libro) and Fundamento de Esperanto.

1887 non-fiction books
Esperanto history
Esperanto literature
Works published under a pseudonym